Justice Hays may refer to:

Charles Thomas Hays, associate justice of the Supreme Court of Missouri
Jack D. H. Hays, associate justice of the Arizona Supreme Court
Norman R. Hays, associate justice of the Iowa Supreme Court
Steele Hays, associate justice of the Arkansas Supreme Court

See also
 Justice Hayes (disambiguation)